Mandakini Trivedi is an Indian dancer.  In 2015, she has been  the Sangeet Natak Akademi Award for her contribution in Mohiniyattam classical dance.

Early life and education
Trivedi did Masters in Fine Art in Dance from Nalanda Nrityakala Mahavidyalaya. She did her post-graduation in Bharatnatyam.

Career
Trivedi was a professor of Indian Dance at Nalanda Nrityakala Mahavidyalaya for twelve years. She was also a curator of Kalan Ghoda Arts Festival in 2007 and 2008. She is trained in Mohiniattam.

Awards
Sangeet Natak Akademi Award in 2015
Central Government Junior Fellowship

References

Living people
Indian female classical dancers
Performers of Indian classical dance
Year of birth missing (living people)
Mohiniyattam exponents
Recipients of the Sangeet Natak Akademi Award